Quimavongo is a town located in Zaire Province, Angola. As of 2009, it has 15,741 inhabitants.

References

Populated places in Zaire Province
Municipalities of Angola